= Camping World Series =

Camping World Series can refer to the following NASCAR racing series:

- Camping World Truck Series
- K&N Pro Series East, formerly the Camping World Series East
- K&N Pro Series West, formerly the Camping World Series West
